Kiran Desai (born 3 September 1971) is an Indian author. Her novel The Inheritance of Loss won the 2006 Man Booker Prize  and the National Book Critics Circle Fiction Award. In January 2015, The Economic Times listed her as one of 20 "most influential" global Indian women.

Early and personal life
Kiran Desai is the daughter of novelist Anita Desai. Kiran was born in Delhi, then spent the early years of her life in Punjab and Mumbai. She studied at Cathedral and John Connon School. She left India at 14, and she and her mother lived in England for a year before moving to the United States.

Kiran Desai studied creative writing at Bennington College, Hollins University, and Columbia University.

Work
Desai's first novel, Hullabaloo in the Guava Orchard, was published in 1998 and received accolades from figures as Salman Rushdie. It won the Betty Trask Award, a prize given by the Society of Authors for best new novels by citizens of the Commonwealth of Nations under the age of 35.

Her second book, The Inheritance of Loss, (2006) was widely praised by critics throughout Asia, Europe and the United States. It won the 2006 Man Booker Prize, as well as the 2006 National Book Critics Circle Fiction Award. Desai became the youngest-ever woman to win the Booker Prize at the age of 35 (this was later broken by Eleanor Catton in 2013).

In August 2008, Desai was a guest on Private Passions, the biographical music discussion programme hosted by Michael Berkeley on BBC Radio 3. In May 2007 she was the featured author at the inaugural Asia House Festival of Cold Literature.

Desai was awarded a 2013 Berlin Prize Fellowship at the American Academy in Berlin.

Desai lives in New York City. She stated in 2017 that she had been working for over a decade on a new book "about power… about a young Indian woman out in India and the world", which was slated to be out the following year. The novel has not been released; as of 2021, Desai has published no books since her Booker Prize-winning second novel in 2006.

Bibliography

See also
 Desai
 Indian English literature
 Indian Writers

References

External links

 Legacies, Loss and Literature, Nirali Magazine, December 2006
 SAWNET biography
 Rediff interview
 Lunch with Kiran Desai
 Bold Type: Interview with Kiran Desai
 Kiran Desai interview with THECOMMENTARY.CA October 2007
 Kiran Desai at the American Academy Berlin as Holtzbrinck Fellow

1971 births
Living people
American Hindus
20th-century American novelists
21st-century American novelists
Bennington College alumni
Booker Prize winners
Columbia University School of the Arts alumni
English-language writers from India
Hollins University alumni
Indian emigrants to the United States
Indian people of German descent
American novelists of Indian descent
American women novelists
American women writers of Indian descent
Cathedral and John Connon School alumni
Women writers from Chandigarh
Novelists from Delhi
21st-century Indian novelists
20th-century Indian novelists
Indian women novelists
20th-century Indian women writers
21st-century Indian women writers
21st-century Indian writers
Women writers from Delhi
20th-century American women writers
21st-century American women writers